This article is a list of events in the year 2005 in Uzbekistan.

Incumbents
 President: Islam Karimov
 Prime Minister: Shavkat Mirziyoyev

Events

May
 May 13 - Andijan Massacre
 Thousands of Uzbeks take over a high security jail in Andijan freeing thousands in protest against the jail sentence of 23 businessmen accused of being Islamic extremists.
 Violence erupts in Andijan with demands from the rally for the government to resign.
 Over 500 protesters have been shot dead by riot police.
 A man with mental illness is shot fatally outside the Israeli embassy in the capital of Tashkent, with government sources alleging him to be a suicide bomber.
 May 14 - Thousands of Uzbeks return to the streets in protests despite the massacre yesterday.
 May 15 - Andijan is sealed shut by the government with British Foreign Secretary Jack Straw telling the BBC that there has been a "clear abuse of human rights" in Uzbekistan.
 May 16 - Uzbek authorities seal another city shut. This time, it is Qorasuv near the border to Kyrgyzstan where many have fled the violence.
 May 18 - The border town of Qorasuv is claimed to be under control of a new Islamic administration led by Baxtiyor Rahimov.
 May 19 - Qorasuv is retaken by the Uzbek military and arrest Rahimov. Officials claim 169 were killed in the unrest but many sources claim over 500 have been killed.

June
 June 7 - Human Rights Watch demands an investigation into the unrest and accuses the government of covering up a massacre.

References

 
2000s in Uzbekistan
Years of the 21st century in Uzbekistan
Uzbekistan
Uzbkeistan